Sergo Anastasi Mikoyan (June 5, 1929 – March 7, 2010) was one of the Soviet Union's leading historians who specialized on the foreign policies of the Soviet Union and the United States in Latin America. He was the son of Anastas Mikoyan, an Old Bolshevik and high level Soviet statesman and adviser to Soviet leader Nikita Khrushchev.

Biography

Early life and education
Mikoyan was born to Ashkhen and Anastas Mikoyan in Moscow on June 5, 1929. He joined the Communist Party in 1953. In 1952, he graduated from the Moscow State Institute of International Relations. Mikoyan continued to live in Moscow until 1955. During the height of the Cuban Missile Crisis in October 1962, Mikoyan accompanied his father Anastas Mikoyan, as his executive secretary, to Cuba in high level negotiations with Fidel Castro and documented much of his father's private reminisces about the crisis. From 1970 onwards, he was the chief editor of the leading Soviet journal on Latin American affairs, Latinskaya Amerika, a Russian-language monthly. During perestroika, Mikoyan was also a prominent supporter of the Karabakh movement.

Scholarly life
Beginning in the late 1980s, Mikoyan was a participant in several joint Soviet/Russian-American international conferences on the crisis including the Harvard University sponsored conference at Cambridge, Massachusetts in October 1987, the Moscow conference in 1989, the Antigua conference in 1991 and the Havana conference in January 1992. He also participated at the 40th Anniversary Conference of the crisis held from October 10 through October 12, 2002. Mikoyan later became a chief researcher at the Institute of Peace at the Russian Academy of Sciences and held a professorship at Georgetown University.

Ever since the collapse of the Soviet Union in December 1991, Mikoyan's research and the possession of his father's unpublished memoirs have proved as important sources to American historians who specialize on the recent issues, namely the Cuban Missile Crisis, that have dominated the foreign affairs of the United States and the Soviet Union towards the countries of Latin America since the mid-1950s. While the focus of his studies also included Asia, Mikoyan's work was largely concentrated on the leftist revolutionary movements in the region, most notably Cuba, and its leaders such as Fidel Castro and Che Guevara.

Among the American historians and journalists Mikoyan has collaborated with are William Taubman, Jon Lee Anderson, Georgie Anne Geyer and Irving Louis Horowitz.

Mikoyan died of leukemia in a Moscow clinic on March 7, 2010.

Selected works
 США: Государство Пoлитикa, Bыбopы [The USA: Government, Politics, Elections]. Moscow, 1969.
 Kyбa строит социализм [Cuba Builds Socialism]. Moscow, 1976.
 "The Caribbean Crisis in Retrospect" in Latinskaya Amerika. no. 1 (January 1988), pp. 40–80.
Mikoyan, Anastas and Mikoyan, Sergo (ed.) The Memoirs of Anastas Mikoyan: The Path of Struggle, Vol 1. Translated from Russian. Sphinx Press, 1988 
Stalinism as I saw it. Occasional Paper. Washington: Kennan Institute for Advanced Russian Studies, 1991.
"The Future of the Soviet-Cuban Relationship" in The Russians Aren't Coming: New Soviet Policy in Latin America, ed. Wayne S. Smith. Boulder, Colorado: Lynne Rienner Publishers, 1992.
The Soviet Cuban Missile Crisis: Castro, Mikoyan, Kennedy, Khrushchev, and the Missiles of November, ed. Svetlana Savranskaya, Cold War International History Project. Stanford: Stanford University Press, 2012.

Notes

Soviet historians
1929 births
Russian people of Armenian descent
Moscow State Institute of International Relations alumni
Communist Party of the Soviet Union members
2010 deaths
Deaths from leukemia
Writers from Moscow
Soviet Armenians
Mikoyan family